The Pakistan Muslim League (F) (acronym: PMLF, PML-F, PML (F)) is a nationalist and pro-Hurs clan political party in Pakistan. It is one of the Pakistan Muslim Leagues. The letter 'F' in its name stands for functional. It is primarily associated with the Sindhi religious leader Pir Pagara. It was formed in 1985 when the Pakistani establishment decided to make Muhammad Khan Junejo the president of united PML. In response, Pir Pagara Syed Shah Mardan Shah-II parted ways with the mother league and formed his own party.

After Mohtarma Fatima Jinnah was defeated by Ayub Khan in the Pakistani presidential election, 1965, Jinnah established the Pakistan Muslim League (Functional). Pir Pagaro Syed Shah Mardan Shah-II became the head of this political party. He was also nominated as first president of United Muslim League. He was Chief of Pakistan Muslim League-Functional (PML-F), and spiritual leader of the ‘Hur’ Jamaat organization.

In the 2002 Pakistani general election, the party won 1.1% of the popular vote and 4 out of 272 elected members.

In May 2004, PML (Functional) merged with PML (Q) along with other parties to form the united PML.

However, after 2 months in July 2004, Pir Pagara and the PML (F) parted ways with the united PML citing differences with the Chaudhry brothers and calling the PML, the Jatt league.

In the 2008 Pakistani general election, the PML-F won 4 seats, and were given one reserved women's seat raising to their total to 5 National Assembly seats. Additionally, the party won 8 provincial assembly seats in Sindh and 3 in Punjab.

In September 2010 the Pakistan Muslim League (F) and PML-Q united, forming the All Pakistan Muslim League (Pir Pagara).

In January 2012 after the death of 7th Pir Pagara Syed Shah Mardan Shah-II his son Syed Sibghatullah Shah Rashdi III the 8th Pir Pagara became the President of Pakistan Muslim League (F).The Headquarters of PML (F) was then shifted to Raja House from Kingri House.

In the 2013 Pakistani general election, PML-F won 6 seats in National Assembly and 10 seats in Provincial Assembly of Sindh, PML (F) joined the government of Nawaz Sharif. Pirzada Sadaruddin Shah Rashdi, younger brother of Syed Sibghatullah Shah Rashdi III, of  Pakistan Muslim League (F) was made the Minister of Overseas Pakistanis.

For the 2018 Pakistani general election, PML-F lead a new coalition named Grand Democratic Alliance with Awami Tahreek, National Peoples Party, Pakistan Peoples Party Workers and Pakistan Peoples Muslim League.

Electoral history

National Assembly elections

See also 
 Pakistan Muslim League (N)
 Awami Muslim League
 Pakistan Muslim League (Q)
 Pakistan Muslim League (Jinnah)

References

Political parties in Pakistan
Muslim League
Muslim League breakaway groups
P
National conservative parties
Pakistani nationalism
Centrist parties in Asia